Mount Pleasant Historic District may refer to:

 Mount Pleasant Historic District (Carnesville, Georgia), listed on the NRHP in Georgia
 Mount Pleasant Historic District (Boston, Massachusetts), listed on the NRHP in Massachusetts
 Mount Pleasant Downtown Historic District (Isabella, Michigan), listed on the NRHP in Michigan
 Mount Pleasant Historic District (Mount Pleasant, New Jersey), listed on the NRHP in New Jersey
 Mount Pleasant Historic District (Mount Pleasant, North Carolina), listed on the NRHP in North Carolina
Mount Pleasant Collegiate Institute Historic District, Mount Pleasant, North Carolina, listed on the NRHP in North Carolina
 Mount Pleasant Historic District (Mt. Pleasant, Ohio), listed on the NRHP in Ohio
 Mount Pleasant Historic District (Harrisburg, Pennsylvania), listed on the NRHP in Pennsylvania
Mount Pleasant Historic District (Mount Pleasant, Pennsylvania), listed on the NRHP in Pennsylvania
 Mount Pleasant Historic District (Mount Pleasant, South Carolina), listed on the NRHP in South Carolina
Mount Pleasant Commercial Historic District (Mount Pleasant, Tennessee), listed on the NRHP in Tennessee
Mount Pleasant Commercial Historic District (Mount Pleasant, Utah), listed on the NRHP in Utah
 Mount Pleasant Historic District (Washington, D.C.), listed on the NRHP in Washington, D.C.

See also
Mount Pleasant Commercial Historic District (disambiguation)